Dermit McEncroe, Irish doctor and poet, fl. early 18th-century

MacEncroe resided in Paris, France, where in 1728 he published several poems. One of these was titled Calamus Hibernicus, sive laus Hiberniae breviter adumbrata.

References

External links
 https://archive.org/stream/irishecclesiast01unkngoog#page/n46/mode/1up
 McEncroe, in Sébastien Vaillant, Botanicon parisiense […], Jean & Herman Verbeek and Balthazar Lakeman, 1727

Irish poets
18th-century Irish medical doctors
Irish expatriates in France